Dabbahu Volcano (also Boina, Boyna or Moina) is an active volcano located in the remote Afar Region of Ethiopia. This stratovolcano is part of the Afar Triangle (Afar Depression), a highly active volcanic region which includes Erta Ale. An eruption on September 26, 2005 created a large fissure in the ground, known as the Dabbahu fissure.

2005 eruption
The only eruption of the volcano in recorded history occurred on September 26, 2005. Preceding the eruption, the ground swelled and an earthquake swarm consisting of over 130 events occurred. Earthquakes measured 4.2 on the Richter scale. The eruption began 5 kilometers northeast of the summit. Ash from the eruption darkened the area surrounding the volcano for nearly 3 days.

Plate tectonics

The volcano is located along the Somali Plate. Researchers predict that the land along this region, known as the East African Rift, will eventually break away, creating a new island consisting of eastern Ethiopia and Djibouti with a new sea in between. Using seismic data from 2005, a research study predicted that this new ocean would likely be formed in about one million years.

Life
Scientists are studying the fissure for extremophiles.

See also
Erta Ale
Geography of Ethiopia

References

Afar Region
Active volcanoes
Natural disasters in Ethiopia
Stratovolcanoes of Ethiopia
Volcanoes of the Great Rift Valley
Mountains of Ethiopia
Pleistocene stratovolcanoes
2005 disasters in Ethiopia